The 1993 Copa Libertadores group stage (or first stage) was played from 3 February to 26 March 1996. A total of 20 teams competed in the group stage to decide 15 places in the final stages of the 1993 Copa Libertadores, where they joined defending champions São Paulo.

Groups composition
Same as previous editions, the 20 participating teams were divided into 5 groups of 4, which consisted of two teams from one national association and two teams from another. The paired associations for this edition were as follows:

Group 1:  and 
Group 2:  and 
Group 3:  and 
Group 4:  and 
Group 5:  and

Format

In the group stage, each group was played on a home-and-away round-robin basis. The teams were ranked according to the following criteria: 1. Points (2 points for a win, 1 point for a draw, and 0 points for a loss); 2. Goal difference; 3. Goals scored; 4. Away goals scored; 5. Drawing of lots.

If two teams from the same national association tie on points, the above criteria would not apply and their final positions would be determined in an extra match to be played at a neutral venue within their own country.

The winners, runners-up and third placed teams of each group advanced to the round of 16 of the final stages.

Groups

Group 1

Play-off match
As the Venezuelan teams were tied 4–4 on points, a play-off on a neutral ground within Venezuela was required to determine the third and fourth place.

Group 2

Group 3

Group 4

Play-off match
As the Colombian teams were tied 7–7 on points, a play-off on a neutral ground within Colombia was required to determine the second and third place.

Group 5

References

External links
Copa Libertadores de América 1993, at RSSSF.org
Copa Libertadores de América 1993 details

 
February 1993 sports events in South America
March 1993 sports events in South America